Martha Gunn (1726–1815) was possibly the most famous of the "dippers", certainly the most famous in Brighton. She lived at 36 East Street, Brighton, in a house that still stands. Her grave stone stands in St Nicholas' churchyard in Brighton.

The Morning Herald described Martha Gunn as "The Venerable Priestess of the Bath"

Profession
A dipper was the operator of a bathing machine used by women bathers. The dipper pushed the machine into and out of the water and helped the bather into and out of the water. A dipper had to be large and strong to carry out this work and Martha Gunn fulfilled both requirements.

Fame and notoriety
Martha Gunn was well known in the town and also known across the country. Her image appeared in many popular engravings including one in which she appeared repelling the invading French with a mop. In another she is seen standing behind Mrs Fitzherbert and The Prince of Wales (the future George IV).

Martha Gunn was said to be a favourite of the Prince of Wales and had free access to the royal kitchens.

Legacy
Several works of art show the image of Martha Gunn. The image on this page is titled "Martha Gunn and the Prince Of Wales". Whilst the exact date of the painting is unknown it is unlikely to actually show the Prince of Wales as he didn't visit Brighton until he was twenty one and Martha Gunn herself is not thought to have ever left Brighton. The original of this painting now hangs in the tea-room of the Royal Pavilion.

Her image is on several contemporary engravings and cartoons and a toby jug was made of her in 1840.

There is a pub in Upper Lewes Road, Brighton called the Martha Gunn and she has a bus named after her. The Brighton-based pop group Martha Gunn also take their name from her.

Rhyme
To Brighton came he,Came George III's son.To be bathed in the sea,By famed Martha Gunn.(Old English rhyme, author unknown)

References

Carder, Timothy. The Encyclopaedia of Brighton. East Sussex County Libraries. 1990. 
Displays at the Brighton Fishing Museum, Kings Road Arches, Brighton

External links
Brief Biog.
Site with an image of the toby jug

1726 births
1815 deaths
People from Brighton